Ranat (also spelled ranad or ranaat) is the generic name for keyboard percussion instruments used in the music of Thailand. The bars of the various types of ranat may be made from hardwood or bamboo (ranat ek  and ranat thum ), metal (ranat ek lek  and ranat thum lek ), or, much more rarely, glass (ranat kaeo ). 

The earliest known description of ranat in Thailand was written in 19th century (1826 AD), an instrument probably of Burmese origin (pattala) focusing on the foot of the pattala Phanat (ဖိနပ်, lit. "shoes").

See also
Ranat ek
Ranat thum
Ranat ek lek
Ranat thum lek
Ranat kaeo
Bong lang
Traditional Thai musical instruments

References

External links
http://www.culture.go.th/research/musical/html/en_musical_central.php?musical=ranad_ek
http://www.thaikids.com/ranad/direct1.htm
http://nugranad.org/

Keyboard percussion instruments
Thai musical instruments